Burnley Football Club is an English professional association football club based in the town of Burnley, Lancashire. Founded on 18 May 1882, the club was one of the first to become professional (in 1883), putting pressure on the Football Association (FA) to permit payments to players. In 1885, the FA legalised professionalism, so the team entered the FA Cup for the first time in 1885–86, and were one of the twelve founding members of the Football League in 1888. Burnley have played in all four professional divisions of English football from 1888 to the present day. The team have been champions of England twice, in 1920–21 and 1959–60, have won the FA Cup once, in 1913–14, and have won the FA Charity Shield twice, in 1960 and 1973. Burnley are one of only five teams to have won all four professional divisions of English football, along with Wolverhampton Wanderers, Preston North End, Sheffield United and Portsmouth. They were the second to achieve this by winning the Fourth Division in the 1991–92 season.

Footballers can be called up to represent their national team in a senior international match; a total of 97 players have won at least one cap for their country in senior international football while playing for Burnley, representing 24 nations. In March 1889, John Yates became the first Burnley player to be capped when he appeared for England against Ireland in the 1888–89 British Home Championship; Yates scored a hat-trick in what proved to be his only international match. Two Burnley-born players have won caps for the England national team while at the club: Jimmy Crabtree in 1894 and 1895 and Billy Bannister in 1901. Tommy Morrison became the club's first non-English international when he played for Ireland against Wales in 1899. In 2001, Trinidad and Tobago international Ian Cox became the first Burnley player to represent a country from outside the British Isles. The only decade during which the club did not have an international representative was the 1990s.

Nine Burnley players have appeared for their country at the FIFA World Cup. The first Burnley player to make an appearance in the competition was Scotsman Jock Aird in 1954. Goalkeeper Colin McDonald is the club's only international to have represented England in the tournament—he played four matches in 1958. Northern Irishmen Jimmy McIlroy and Billy Hamilton both made a club record five appearances at the World Cup, while Hamilton became Burnley's first player to score in the competition—he netted twice against Austria in 1982. McIlroy also holds the club record for most caps won (51) and the most international goals scored (10) while playing for Burnley. In 2012, New Zealander Cameron Howieson became the club's youngest ever international at the age of 17.

List of internationals
Key
Players are initially arranged by alphabetical order of surname.
Appearances as a substitute are included.
International years indicates the year of the player's first and last caps while a Burnley player. Caps included are for the number won by the player during his time with Burnley and may not be the full total of the player's career.
Statistics are correct as of 17 December 2022.

Notes

References
Specific

General

 Internationals
Burnley Internationals
Association football player non-biographical articles
Burnley